Naftalan may refer to:

 Naftalan, Azerbaijan, a city in central Azerbaijan
 Naftalan oil, a special crude oil found in the Azerbaijani city
 Naftalan (Croatia), a hospital and spa center located near Ivanić-Grad, Croatia

See also
 Naphthalene, the chemical compound